The wrestling competition at the 2014 South American Games was held in Santiago, Chile. The tournament was held from 25–29 March at the Polideportivo de Carabineros. The winner of each event qualified their country for the 2015 Pan American Games in Toronto, Canada.

Medal table

Medal summary
Results:

Men's events

Women's events

References

2014 South American Games events
2014 in sport wrestling
Qualification tournaments for the 2015 Pan American Games
Wrestling in Chile
2014